System A-235 PL-19 Nudol is a Russian anti-ballistic missile and anti-satellite weapon system in development. It is designed to deflect a nuclear attack on Moscow and important industrial regions. The main developer of the system is JSC Concern VKO Almaz-Antey. The new system should replace the current one — A-135. The two main differences will be that the A-235 will use conventional warheads and it will be mobile.

The A-235 system will use Don-2N radar as well as Don 2NP / 5N20P as range radar, with updated software and hardware; the guidance system of the A-235 complex will be similar to the existing system A-135. The A-235, when deployed, could be equipped with a nuclear warhead which would greatly increase its ability to destroy incoming warheads. The yield on which it would be deployed is not yet known. According to reports in early 2018, the system will not be equipped with nuclear warheads. According to Russian sources, the system will be deployed at points surrounding Moscow by the end of 2018.

The new PRS-1M (45T6) is a modernized variant of the PRS-1 (53T6 Gazelle) and can use nuclear or conventional warheads. It can hit targets at ranges of 350 km and altitudes of 50 km.

The long-range missiles will most likely be equipped with nuclear warheads, while the others will have kinetic energy warheads. Testing of new missiles for the A-235 Samolyot-M system began in August 2014.

Design   
Initially, the A-235 missile defense system was planned to have three-echelons: long-range echelon with the A-925 missile, the middle echelon was the 58R6 firing complex, and the short-range flight was the PRS-1M missiles (the result of the upgrade of the PRS-1 missiles). In the modified A-235 anti-missile and anti-space defense system, it is planned to use two-stage anti-missiles with high-explosive and nuclear warheads, providing it with the ability to shoot down hypersonic attack weapons, hypersonic orbital platforms, ballistic missiles, and their combat units, as well as satellites in near space.

Tests
On 4 June 2019, the Russian Ministry of Defense posted a video showing the successful interception of the test target which was a test of a new anti-ballistic missile system in the form of a long-range surface to air missile. Though the nature of the air defense system which was being tested was not mentioned it has been widely speculated to have been a test of the S-500 Prometheus long-range surface to air missile system which entered early production earlier in the year. However, it also could have been the test of the A-235 anti-ballistic missile system which tests have been conducted on since 2014.

The anti-ballistic missile system was tested at Plesetsk Cosmodrome, on 15 April 2020, at the ex-launch site of the Tsyklon-2 rocket.

On 15 November 2021, the missile successfully destroyed the Kosmos 1408 satellite. The breakdown of the satellite caused space debris to form, which forced the crew of ISS to shelter. The debris passed every 93 minutes.

The latest test was conducted on 1 December 2022.

See also 
S-500 missile system
Ground-Based Midcourse Defense

References

Anti-ballistic missiles of Russia
Missile defense
Almaz-Antey products